David Scott Lucas (born 19 August 1978) is an English first-class cricketer, who last played for Worcestershire County Cricket Club. He previously played for Nottinghamshire, Yorkshire and Northamptonshire. He won the NBC Denis Compton Award in 2000.

Career
A left-arm fast-medium bowler, he first played for Nottinghamshire Second XI in 1996 and made his debut for Nottinghamshire in first-class cricket in 1999. He played at Trent Bridge until 2003, although he was selected only for one day games in his latter two seasons. Seeking first-team cricket, Lucas moved to Yorkshire for the 2005 season, but failed to cement a place in the team. He played for Lincolnshire in the Minor Counties Championship in 2006, and then moved to Northamptonshire in 2007. After a poor start especially in one day cricket, he became a first-team starter in all forms of the game. He recorded his best innings figures of 7 for 24 and match figures of 12 for 73 against Gloucestershire in 2009. In August 2011, Lucas signed a three-year contract with Division one side Worcestershire.

References

External links

Northants Cricket Page

1978 births
Living people
English cricketers
Yorkshire cricketers
Nottinghamshire cricketers
Northamptonshire cricketers
Cricketers from Nottingham
Lincolnshire cricketers
Worcestershire cricketers